Elna is an unincorporated community in Johnson County, Kentucky, United States. It is located at an elevation of 876 feet (267 m).  Elna is located in the ZIP Code Tabulation Area for ZIP code 41219.

References

Unincorporated communities in Johnson County, Kentucky
Unincorporated communities in Kentucky